The Viramgam–Surendranagar section covers a distance of 65 km in Gujarat.

History
During 19th century Viramgam railway station owned by BB&CI. During which Ahmedabad–Viramgam section was laid. In 1872 BB&CI line was extended to Surendranagar. Later Broad gauge network up to Surendranagar was extended in 1879 by BB & CI Railway The gauge conversion of Viramgam–Hapa section in the year 1980.

Doubling
Doubling of Viramgam Surendranagar section has been completed since October 2015. Trains have started to ply on the newly laid up line.

References

5 ft 6 in gauge railways in India
Railway lines in Gujarat

1872 establishments in India